Grobogan Regency is a regency located in northeastern part of the Central Java province in Indonesia.

Created on 4 March 1726, the Grobogan Regency has an area of 2,022.25 km2, and is the second largest regency in the Central Java Province. It had a population of 1,308,696 at the 2010 census, 1,351,429 at the Intermediate census of 2015 and 1,453,526 at the 2020 census. Its capital is the town of Purwodadi.

Administrative districts
Grobogan is divided into nineteen districts, listed below with their areas and populations at the 2010 census, the 2015 intermediate census and the 2020 census. The most westerly twelve of these districts (with a combined population of 888,581 at the 2020 census) lie within the officially defined Semarang Metropolitan Area (known as Kedungsepur); the remaining seven districts to the east (indicated by asterisks (*) following their names in the table below) are outside the Semarang Metropolitan Area. The table also includes the locations of the district administrative centres, the number of administrative villages (rural desa and urban kelurahan) in each district, and its postal code.

The regency includes a total of 280 villages. Bordering Grobogan Regency to the north are the Demak, Pati and Kudus Regencies, to the east is Blora Regency, to the south are the Ngawi (East Java Province), Sragen and Boyolali Regencies and to the west is Semarang Regency. The government of the regency is led by a regent. The current regent is Sri Sumarni.

History

Grobogan Regency became the center of the Mataram kingdom with its capital in Medhang Kamulan or Sumedang Purwocarito or Purwodadi. The capital was later moved to around town Prambanan as Mamratipura or Poh Pitu or Watugaluh.

During the time of Medang and Kahuripan, Grobogan region was important to those country. Meanwhile, in the time of Majapahit, Demak, and Pajang, Grobogan was always associated with folklore of Ki Ageng Sela, Ki Ageng Tarub, Bondan Kejawan, and the story of Aji Saka.

During the Islamic Mataram kingdom, Grobogan region were included as Mancanegara and had become the coordinative area of Regent Nayoko Ponorogo: Adipati Surodiningrat. In the times of War Prangwadanan and War Mangkubumen, the region was a power base of Prince Prangwedana (Raden Mas Said) and Prince Mangkubumi.

Grobogan region covers Sukowati area north of Bengawan Solo, Warung, Sela, Kuwu, Teras Karas, Cengkal Sewu, even to the northern Kedu (Schrieke, II, 1957: 76: 91). Sukowati area is then partially included to Sragen regency. Bumi Kejawen, Sukowati, Sukodono, Glagah, Tlawah, Pinggir, Jekawal, and others. Areas such as Repaking, Ngleses, Gubug, South Kedungjati, Kemusu, are included to Boyolali Regency.

Meanwhile, the areas which then included to Grobogan Regency are : Purwodadi, Grobogan, Kuwu, sela, Teras Karas, Medang Kamulan, Warung (Wirosari), Wirasaba (Saba), Tarub, Getas, and more.

Later, the provision of the Giyanti Agreement (1755) stated, as a Mancanegara region, Grobogan were included as Sultanate, with Madiun, half of Pacitan, Magetan, Caruban, Jipang (Bojonegoro), Teras Karas (Ngawen), Sela, Warung (Kuwu-Wirosari). (Sukanto, 1958: 5–6).

A then based on the agreement between the GG Daendels with PAA Amangkunegara in Yogyakarta, dated January 10, 1811, it was stipulated that the money-shore that should be paid by the Dutch Government is deleted. Second, a part of Kedu (Grobogan area), some areas in Semarang, Demak, Jepara, Salatiga, Grobogan districts, Wirosari, Sesela, Warung, daerah-daerah Jipang, dan Japan were submitted to the Dutch Government. And third, areas around Boyolali, Galo, and the district Cawer Wetan were given to Yogyakarta (Ibid.: 77).

During the Diponegoro War, the area of Grobogan, Purwodadi, Wirosari, Mangor (?), Demak, Kudus, lost in the fire of war against the Dutch (Sagimun MD, 1960: 32, 331–332).

In 1848–1850, as a result of a famine, the population of Grobogan dropped substantially, from 89,000 in 1848 to only 9,000 in 1850.

Geography

Grobogan is a flat valley lying between two mountains, Pegunungan Kendeng to the south and Pegunungan Kapur Utara to the north. Although the town is known to be very hot during the dry season, Grobogan is one of the main rice producers in Central Java, which mainly supported by several man-made dams, such as Bendungan Klambu, Bendungan Sedadi and Bendungan Kedung Ombo.

The construction of Bendungan Kedung Ombo was a source of national debate due to the social cost of this gigantesque project supported be the World Bank. The two main rivers are Kali Lusi (or Pilang) and Kali Serang. During the rainy seasons, the two rivers cause floods which often destroys the harvests.

Religion
Similar to other regencies in Java, Islam is the dominant religion, with significant presence of Christianity - both Protestant and Catholic, Hindu, and Buddhism. In some places, one can still find traditional beliefs, Aliran kepercayaan and Kejawen. There are two Catholic Parishes, Paroki Purwodadi and Paroki Gubug, which are administered by Semarang Diocese (Keuskupan Agung Semarang).

Education
Most of the schools are public schools. The private educations mainly are provided by the Madrassah, Muhammadiyah, both are Muslim, as well as by Protestant institution and The Union of Teachers of the Republic of Indonesia (PGRI - Persatuan Guru Republic Indonesia). There is almost no higher learning institution in Purwodadi. The senior high school participation is still low (21,19% in 2004) in 58,13 for the junior high school participation.

Economy
Agriculture and public sectors are the main providers of labor market. There is no significant industry, while the mining sectors remain insignificant for the economy of the regions. Many male young people work as seasonal workers in bigger cities like Semarang and Jakarta as construction workers, tricyclists (tukang becak) and other unskilled occupations. While for their female counterparts, they work in manufacture industries. In the recent years, the numbers of female migrant workers have increased significantly with the main destination in Singapore, Malaysia, Hong Kong, and Gulf Countries. There is a possibility of brain drain in Purwodadi, since those who are highly educated tend to find a better and more promising career outside the region or abroad.

The per capita income in 2004 is Rp 611.968,49 (around 70 US$). Formerly known as one of the poorest regencies in Central Java, Grobogan now is the 18 in the economic scale, out of 35 regencies. However, 34,05% of its population in 2004 lived in the poverty line.

Arts and culture
Located between Surakarta (Solo City and Demak), Grobogan has a strong influence of both the more direct Islam Culture from the Sultane of Demak and more subtle culture of Kingdom of Surakarta (Kasunanan Surakarta). This has been reflected in its traditional arts and performances, such as Shadow Puppet (Wayang Kulit), Javanese Theatre (Kethoprak). Although they almost disappear from the local society, those two forms of performances can still be easily found in different parts of Central Java. Other forms of cultural performances are almost wiped out from the live of Groboganese, such as Angguk, Kentrung, Ledhek/Tayup, Barongan and Reyog. Angguk was performed mainly by a group of young girls aged between 13 and 17 years, doing a marching dance inspired by the different forms of old Dutch army and royal army from Demak and Surakarta. Kentrung is a story telling in a form of songs performed by a man with the accompaniment of a traditional percussion (kendang). The stories were mainly based on the local history or the history of Prophet Mohammed. It is possible that Kentrung was used to spread out the teaching of Islam.  Ledhek/Tayub is a group of Javanese musicians and singer-dancers which was very popular due to their sensual gestures. Apart from the sensual gestures of the dancers, Tayup was/is also famous since they involve/invite the spectators to dance along with them. This kind of participative performance is rare in the Javanese context. Barongan is a Javanese version of Barongsay, the dance of Dragon, where the influence of Chinese culture can be seen from the form of the dragon, the use of the dominance red color. The difference with the Barongsay, Barongan normally presided Reyog, a trance dance. Reyog in Purwodadi was different with the more extravagance Reyog of Ponorogo. In the middle of the trance, some of the dancers could involve the eating of broken glasses and raw skins of rice (brambut).

Other examples of cultural performances were related with the life cycle rites such as Kathaman and Ngantenan. Khataman is a circumcision ceremony in which it is used as a symbol of a young boy's entrance into adulthood. Normally, Kathaman is applied only to Muslim boys. The boy would be dressed with a dress like an Arab Sheikh, and taken by horse from his house to the nearby mosque. This procession is accompanied with Islamic music. Ngantenan is basically the wedding ceremony, which we can see clearly the influence of Hindu culture. Nevertheless, while welcoming the invitee, the bride and groom would be put at the center of the house with brights and colourful costumes including the traditional Javanese costumes, Arabic costumes, and supposed to be modern western costumes with sun-glasses. They can change up to seven costumes within 6 hours.

It is very unfortunate, that most of these tradition has almost all disappeared due to coming of more global and uniformed culture. Kethoprak, Kentrung, Angguk, Barongan and Reyog were used to be the expressions of thanks of the people during the wedding or other important ceremonies. Now they have been replaced either by video-movies, or by Dangdut concerts.

In early 80s, Purwodadi had two cinemas, Bioskop Kencana, located right in the commercial center of the town, and Bioskop Simpang Lima, in the southern part of the town, not so far from Simpang Lima roundabout. Unfortunately, due to the presence of television and video (and now VCD and DVD players), now, both cinemas do not have activities. The outdoor cinema, more known as Layar Tancep, once used to be a source of entertainment in the villages around the town, which the organiser was invited by the village authority for special occasions to the villagers. This type of cinema has also faded away.

Cuisine
The regency is famous for its Swikee or Sweekee, a soup of frog legs. In fact, Swikee is a Chinese term for the soup, perhaps introduced by the Chinese community in the region. Normally the soup is well accompanied by dark and sweet Soya sauce (Kecap Manis), which is also the specialty of the town. However, the dish is more known by those who live in the city center rather than in villages. The frogs can be found easily during the wet seasons, among the rice fields or in the bank of Lusi river. The poor villagers will tend to sell the frogs in the market. They are rather happy to consume the fresh water crabs (called Yuyu in Javanese which is smaller in size than their cousin from the sea) and fresh water snail (Keong/Besusul). The soup of water crabs (Jangan Yuyu) is normally prepared during the rainy season before the rice harvests. This soup is very rich in taste and has very high protein content. However, this delicacy can not be found in any restaurant but easily found in farmers’ household. The soup of snail (Jangan Keong) is also another delicacy that can not be found in any restaurant in Indonesia, nevertheless, the similar dish can be found in Lisbon, Portugal. The snails are also prepared as brochette/satay (Sate Keong).

Access and transportation
By bus, Purwodadi Bus Terminal (Terminal Simpang Lima) has direct lines to Semarang, Jakarta (Pulogadung, Lebak Bulus, Tanjung Priok, Kampung Rambutan, Pasar Rebo), Bekasi (Pondok Gede), Tangerang (Ciputat, Ciledug), Bogor (Parung), Solo (Tirtonadi), Kudus, Demak, Blora, Pati, Malang (Arjosari), Denpasar, Bali (Ubung), and Surabaya. The train station in the city center was closed in the early eighties, and the main train station now is Ngrombo in Toroh District (+/- 8 km south of Town center), which is the part of DAOP 4 Semarang. The closest airports are A Yani Airport in Semarang (+/- 60 km west of Purwodadi), and Adi Sumarmo International Airport in Solo City (south of Purwodadi).

References

External links
 Official Site of Grobogan
 Unofficial Site of Grobogan